George dos Santos Paladini (born 13 March 1978 in Rio de Janeiro), known mononymously George, is a Brazilian footballer who last played for Wellington Phoenix in the A-League.

Biography
He started his football career in Brazil with Flamengo before moving to Portugal for five years to play for C.D. Santa Clara.

He returnend to Brazil to play for Sport Recife before he left to play for Venezuelan club Carabobo.

In June 2007, he was signed by A-League club Wellington Phoenix, but left in November 2007.

External links
 Released from Phoenix.
 Brazilian FA Database

1978 births
Living people
Brazilian footballers
Brazilian expatriate footballers
Footballers from Rio de Janeiro (city)
CR Flamengo footballers
Sport Club do Recife players
C.D. Santa Clara players
Wellington Phoenix FC players
Primeira Liga players
A-League Men players
Brazilian expatriate sportspeople in Argentina
Brazilian expatriate sportspeople in Venezuela
Brazilian expatriate sportspeople in New Zealand
Expatriate footballers in Argentina
Expatriate footballers in Venezuela
Expatriate association footballers in New Zealand
Association football forwards